Anopina asaphes is a moth of the family Tortricidae. It is found in Guerrero, Mexico.

References

Moths described in 1914
asaphes
Moths of Central America